The 1998–99 National League 2 South (sponsored by Jewson) was the twelfth full season of rugby union within the fourth tier (south) of the English league system.  It is counterpart to National League 2 North, which covers the northern half of the country.  

The title battle was very keenly contested by three clubs but in the end it was Bracknell who came out top, 1 point clear of runners up Esher and 3 clear of 3rd placed North Walsham, to claim their second successive promotion and a place in the 1999–00 National League 1.  It was during this campaign that Bracknell set the (then) English league record of 53 consecutive wins at home.  The battle for relegation was equally well contested with a number of teams fighting for survival.  Despite battling hard Havant would finish in the bottom spot, dead level with 13th placed Cheltenham but with a worse for/against record.  Havant would drop to London 1.  The reason National League 2 South had only one relegation place compared to National League 2 North (who had 3) was that both of the two teams relegated from the division above were based in the north of the country, requiring more places to accommodate for their arrival the following season.

Structure

Each team played home and away matches against each of the other teams, playing a total of twenty-six matches each. The league champions were promoted to National League 1 while the bottom side dropped to either London 1 or South West 1 depending on locality.

Participating teams and locations

League table

Sponsorship
National League 2 South is part of the Jewson National Leagues is sponsored by Jewson.

References

N4
National League 2 South